Evenskjer is the administrative centre of Tjeldsund Municipality in Troms og Finnmark county, Norway. European route E10 passes just to the north of the village of Evenskjer.
 
Skånland Church, one of Northern Norway's largest wooden churches, is located in Evenskjer.  There are also two schools located in the village, Soltun and Skånland.

References

Villages in Troms
Skånland